Barbatia is a genus of "bearded" ark clams, marine bivalve mollusks in the family Arcidae, the ark clams.

This genus is known in the fossil record from the Jurassic period to the Quaternary period (age range: 167.7 to 0.0 million years ago). These fossils have been found all over the world.

Species
Species within the genus Barbatia include:

Barbatia amygdalumtostum (Röding, 1798)
Barbatia barbata (Linnaeus, 1758)
Barbatia bullata (Reeve, 1844)
Barbatia cancellaria (Lamarck, 1819) - red-brown ark   
Barbatia candida (Helbling, 1779) - white-beard ark  
Barbatia clathrata 
Barbatia cometa (Reeve, 1844)
Barbatia complanata  (Bruguière, 1789)
Barbatia divaricata (Sowerby, 1833)   
Barbatia decussata (G. B. Sowerby I, 1833)
Barbatia domingensis (Lamarck, 1819) - white miniature ark 
Barbatia foliata (Forsskål in Niebuhr, 1775)
Barbatia fusca Bruguière 
Barbatia gabonensis Oliver & Cosel, 1993
Barbatia gibba (Martin, 1879) †
Barbatia gradata 
Barbatia grayana Dunker, 1867
Barbatia hachijoensis Hatai, Niino & Kotaka in Niino, 1952
Barbatia hawaia Dall, Bartsch & Rehder, 1938
Barbatia illota (G. B. Sowerby I, 1833)
Barbatia lacerata (Bruguière, 1789)
Barbatia legumen (Lamy, 1907)
Barbatia lurida (G. B. Sowerby I, 1833)
Barbatia molokaia Dall, Bartsch & Rehder, 1938
Barbatia novaezelandiae (E.A. Smith, 1915) - New Zealand ark 
Barbatia oahua Dall, Bartsch & Rehder, 1938
Barbatia obliquata (Wood, 1828)
Barbatia parva (G. B. Sowerby I, 1833)
Barbatia parvivillosa (Iredale, 1939)
Barbatia perinesa Oliver & Chesney, 1994
Barbatia pistachia (Lamarck, 1819)
Barbatia platei (Stempell, 1899)
Barbatia plicata (Dillwyn, 1817)
Barbatia pyrrhotus Oliver & Holmes, 2004
Barbatia reeveana (d'Orbigny, 1846) - low-rib ark   
Barbatia revelata (Deshayes in Maillard, 1863)
Barbatia scazon (Iredale, 1939, 1939)
Barbatia sculpturata Turton, 1932
Barbatia setigera (Reeve, 1844)
Barbatia solidula Dunker, 1868
Barbatia stearnsi (Pilsbry, 1895)
Barbatia tenera (C. B. Adams, 1845) - delicate ark, doc bales ark 
Barbatia terebrans (Iredale, 1939, 1939)
Barbatia trapezina (Lamarck, 1819)
Barbatia virescens (Reeve, 1844)

Extinct species
Extinct species within the genus Barbatia include:

 †Barbatia aegyptiaca  Fourtau 1917
 †Barbatia aspera Conrad 1854
 †Barbatia axinaea  Boettger 1883
 †Barbatia carolinensis  Conrad 1849
 †Barbatia consutilis  Tate 1886
 †Barbatia corvamnis  Harris 1946
 †Barbatia crustata  Tate 1886
 †Barbatia culleni  Dey 1961
 †Barbatia deusseni Gardner 1927
 †Barbatia dissimilis  Tate 1886
 †Barbatia gibba  Martin 1879
 †Barbatia helblingi  Bruguière 1789
 †Barbatia inglisia  Richards and Palmer 1953
 †Barbatia irregularis  Cossmann and Pissaro 1906
 †Barbatia kayalensis  Dey 1961
 †Barbatia legayi  Rigaux and Sauvage 1868
 †Barbatia lignitifera  Aldrich 1908
 †Barbatia limatella  Tate 1886
 †Barbatia ludoviciana 
 †Barbatia malaiana  Martin 1917
 †Barbatia mauryae  Olsson 1922
 †Barbatia merriami Van Winkle 
 †Barbatia mytiloides  (Brocchi, 1814) 
 †Barbatia paradiagona  Dockery 1982
 †Barbatia pistachia Lamarck 1819
 †Barbatia pumila  Tate 1886
 †Barbatia quilonensis  Dey 1961
 †Barbatia rembangensis  Martin 1910
 †Barbatia seraperta  Harris 1946
 †Barbatia simulans  Tate 1886
 †Barbatia subtrigonalis  Martin 1883
 †Barbatia sundaiana  Martin 1916
 †Barbatia uxorispalmeri  Stenzel and E. K. 1957
 †Barbatia wendti  Lamy 1950

References 

 NZ Mollusca
 ITIS
 Miller M & Batt G, Reef and Beach Life of New Zealand, William Collins (New Zealand) Ltd, Auckland, New Zealand 1973
 Powell A. W. B., New Zealand Mollusca, William Collins Publishers Ltd, Auckland, New Zealand 1979 
 Glen Pownall, New Zealand Shells and Shellfish, Seven Seas Publishing Pty Ltd, Wellington, New Zealand 1979 

 
Extant Jurassic first appearances
Bivalve genera